The National Children's Film Festival (NCFF) was established by the Children's Film Society, India (CFSI), in a bid to expand the market for Children's film and encourage talent in the country. The Children's Film Society announced the launch of the first National children's film festival on the heels of the Prime Minister Narendra Modi's cleanliness drive announcement and, in keeping with the Minister's vision, the central theme of the festival will be based upon the 'Swachhta Abhiyaan'.

Entitled as National Children's Film Festival (NCFF), the event will focus on Children's films which are either made or shot in India or the makers are Indian. The festival is a three-day event, which will kick-start at the capital New Delhi in Siri fort Auditorium from 14 November, Children's Day and conclude on 16 November 2014.NCFF will be organized by CFSI every alternate year.

The festival will screen a score of unreleased films with CFSI's production and latest offering, Pappu Ki Pugdandi leading the pack. Other fresh content that will be put up in the festival are Shortcut Safari which will be premiered for the first time, Kaphal, GGBB, Yeh Hai Chakkad Bakkad Bumbe Bo, Summer with the Ghost, - are yet another CFSI production, Krish Trish and Baltiboy- 3, Hawa Hawaii, The Boot Cake are few curated movies amongst others. The films are carefully handpicked to create an opportunity for children to experience qualitative content made exclusively for them. Some of these films have won several awards, globally.

NCFF has garnered eyeballs from the country's celebrated Bollywood personalities such as Amitabh Bachchan, Ajay Devgn and Sonakshi Sinha, who have culled out time from their busy schedule to wish CFSI and NCFF through video bytes. Sania Mirza is  the Guest of honor and celebrities such as Jimmy Shergill and Shiamak Davar team will participate in cultural programmes and workshops.

Vision 
Talking about the festival, Mr. Shravan Kumar, CEO, CFSI said, "At CFSI we not only want to make films but also make film makers. The objective behind this festival is not just to expand the children’s film market or encourage makers to come forward but also to nurture talent from a very young age. If we can showcase the right content and create a conducive environment for children to pursue film making or allied creative careerpaths, I ‘m sure we will get great talent emerging out of our country. Films, I believe is the most powerful medium and if used effectively we can entertain while addressing various pressing issues".

Workshop 
NCFF will present itself as a carnival to woo young audiences and also lend itself as a learning platform through various workshops such as dance, music, magic act, animation and a special focused workshop on Chaplin based on the film "Boot Cake". There will be a kids mela where children can have fun galore after.

A film making workshop for children conducted by "My First Film". This workshop helped children to learn shooting and editing their own short film through easy and fun induced sessions. Presenters were Anand Pandey on fundamentals of film making. Sapan Narula on shot composition and taking stunning videos . Ritesh Taksande took session on Editing and Visual Effects. After completing the workshop the kids were able to make a short film on their own even using camcorders and cell phones.

References

External links 
 http://cfsindia.org/ncff/workshop.php
 http://www.myfirstfilm.org/

Film festivals in India
Film festivals established in 2014
Youth in India
Festivals in Delhi
2014 establishments in Delhi
Children's film festivals
Children's festivals in India